Odd Magne Gridseth (born 27 April 1959 in Ørsta, Sunnmøre, Norway) is a Norwegian musician (bass), known from the Trondheim music scene.

Biography 
Gridseth was regular bassist in the band «Soundtrip» together with guitarist Ove Bjørken, drummer Ernst-Wiggo Sandbakk and keyboardist Jan Gunnar Hoff, a collaboration that was continued with the ensemble «Trondheim Bop-service», which included Ernst-Wiggo Sandbakk, Odd André Elveland (tenor saxophone), Ove Bjørken, Torgeir Andresen (trumpet) and Kåre Kolve (alto saxophone). He was also part of Kjersti Stubø Band, and achieved international fame through being part of Siri Gellein's Svaleband (1987–), while attending the Jazz program at Trondheim Coservatory og Music (NTNU).

Otherwise, he was occasionally in «Brand new sisters» (1984-1988). He also attended the releases Herberget sannheten (1987) by Hans Rotmo, Blodig Alvor (NaNaNaNa) (1988), Splitter Pine (1989), and Pstereo (1990) with DumDum Boys, The Song We Forgot / Mijjen Vuelieh (1991) with Frode Fjellheim, Vårsøg (1991) with Henning Sommerro, Rai Rai (1993) with D.D.E., The Music Machine (1996)Gunnar Andreas Berg, and Landstryker (1996) with Ove Bjørken.

Discography

DumDum Boys 
 1988: Blodig Alvor Na Na Na Na Na (CBS)
 1989: Splitter Pine (CBS)
 1990: Pstereo (CBS)

Siri's Svale Band 
 1990: Blackbird (Sonor Records)
 1997: Necessarily So… (Sonor Records)
 2007: Best of Siri's Svale Band (Mesa Music)

Other collaborations 
 1985: You Say... (CMS Records), with Castberg & Co
 1987: Herberget Sannheten (Plateselskapet), with Ola Uteligger
 1988: På Frifot (Plateselskapet), with Nellie Neuf & Knutsen
 1989: Sorgens Bar (Plateselskapet), with Ola Uteligger
 1991: Humbug & Campari (Plateselskapet), with Feskhandler Thorske
 1991: The Song We Forgot / Mijjen Vuelieh (Iđut), with Frode Fjellheim
 1992: Mikis & Arja (Plateselskapet), with Mikis & Arja
 1992: Slow Burning (Columbia Records), with James Knudsen
 1993: Supernatural (Norsk Plateproduksjon), with Gunnar Andreas Berg
 1993: Rai-Rai (Tylden & Co), with D.D.E.
 1995: Kanskje Kommer Kongen (CNR), with Gustav Lorentzen
 1996: The Music Machine (Curling Legs), with Gunnar Andreas Berg
 1996: Landstryker (Sonor Records), with Ove Bjørken
 1997: Vårsøg (Norske Gram), with Henning Sommerro

References 

Norwegian jazz musicians
Norwegian double-bassists
People from Ørsta
1959 births
Living people
20th-century Norwegian upright-bassists
Male double-bassists
21st-century Norwegian upright-bassists
Male jazz musicians
20th-century Norwegian male musicians
21st-century Norwegian male musicians
Siri's Svale Band members